"Lord Bishop" is a traditional form of address used for bishops since the Middle Ages, an era when bishops occupied the feudal rank of 'lord' by virtue of their office.  Today it is sometimes still used in formal circumstances for any diocesan bishop in the Anglican Communion or Roman Catholic Church (except in countries, such as the United States, where this title is deemed inappropriate); it is not restricted to the 26 Church of England bishops who sit in the House of Lords as Lords Spiritual.  Bishops in the House of Lords are addressed as The Right Reverend Prelate the Lord Bishop of ...

See also

 Prince-Bishop
 Right Reverend
 Most Reverend

References

Episcopacy in Anglicanism
Ecclesiastical styles